Ralph M. Like (1894–1955) was an American film producer. He was involved with several independent film companies producing low-budget releases on Poverty Row. In 1932 he established Mayfair Pictures. Other companies he was involved with were Action Pictures and Progressive Pictures. After his studios folded in 1934, he produced only one further film You Can't Beat the Law for Monogram in 1943. Like also worked as a sound engineer at some of the major studios.

He was married to the actress Blanche Mehaffey, who starred in several of his films.

Selected filmography

 The Desert of the Lost (1927)
 Between Dangers (1927)
 The White Outlaw (1929)
 Fighters of the Saddle (1929)
 Overland Bound (1929)
 The Sky Spider (1931)
 Hell-Bent for Frisco (1931)
 Chinatown After Dark (1931)
 Soul of the Slums (1931)
 Dragnet Patrol (1931)
 Night Beat (1931)
 Anybody's Blonde (1931)
 First Aid (1931)
 The Monster Walks (1932)
 Malay Nights (1932)
 Docks of San Francisco (1932)
 Sally of the Subway (1932)
 Alias Mary Smith (1932)
 The Widow in Scarlet (1932)
 Behind Stone Walls (1932)
 Love in High Gear (1932)
 Behind Jury Doors (1932)
 Sister to Judas (1932)
 The Heart Punch (1932)
 Sin's Pay Day (1932)
 Tangled Destinies (1932)
 Easy Millions (1933)
 Mystery at Monte Carlo (1933)
 Passport to Paradise (1933)
 Riot Squad (1933)
Her Resale Value (1933)
 What's Your Racket? (1934)
 The Ghost Rider (1935)
 The Cowboy and the Bandit (1935)
 You Can't Beat the Law (1943)

References

Bibliography
 Michael R. Pitts. Poverty Row Studios, 1929–1940: An Illustrated History of 55 Independent Film Companies, with a Filmography for Each. McFarland & Company, 2005.

External links

1894 births
1955 deaths
American film producers
Businesspeople from Iowa
20th-century American businesspeople